William Snyder is an American photojournalist and former Director of Photography for The Dallas Morning News. Snyder won a Pulitzer Prize for Explanatory Journalism in 1989 along with reporter David Hanners and artist Karen Blessen for their special report on a 1985 airplane crash, the follow-up investigation, and the implications for air safety. In 1991, he won the Pulitzer Prize for Feature Photography for his pictures of ill and orphaned children living in desperate conditions in Romania. In 1993, Snyder and Ken Geiger won the Pulitzer Prize for Spot News Photography for their photographic coverage of the 1992 Summer Olympics in Barcelona, Spain. As Photo Director he oversaw the Morning News photo staff's 2006 Pulitzer-winning coverage of Hurricane Katrina. In the Spring of 2008, Snyder took the buyout at The Dallas Morning News and returned to his alma mater, the Rochester Institute of Technology, where he is now the chair in the Photojournalism BFA program.

References

http://www.williamsnyderphotography.com/

External links
Snyder Named Director of Photography

American photojournalists
Pulitzer Prize for Explanatory Journalism winners
Pulitzer Prize for Feature Photography winners
Living people
Rochester Institute of Technology alumni
Rochester Institute of Technology faculty
University of Michigan fellows
Year of birth missing (living people)